Sophus Claussen (12 September 1865 Helletofte – 11 April 1931 Gentofte) was a Danish writer. He is best remembered for his neo-romanticism poems.

Biography
Born in 1865, Claussen was the son of politician Rasmus Claussen and Hanne Sophie. He began his studies in 1884 and published his first collection of poetry, which attracted attention due to its daringness and bold eroticism along the lines of Emil Aarestrup's work. For a number of years Claussen was involved with the local press. He first began to make a name for himself through two partially symbolic, partially realistic idylls about life in market towns, "" (1894) and "Kitty" (1895), which through a blend of prose and poetry as well as playfulness and grace captivated readers (particularly his introduction to "": "", likely his most significant work [revised edition 1912]). Claussen later continued his depictions of Danish island life in "" (1899) and "" (1900). His small travel novels "" and "" (both 1896) are unique among his works with their poetically chatty tone. Additionally, he wrote the play "".

Claussen lived in Paris for a number of years and published several smaller books ("" [1901], "" [1904], "" [1910]). After returning to Denmark, he published a comprehensive and characteristic collection of poetry, which defines the capricious nature of his body of work.

Among his later works, "" (1925) and "" (1927) can be highlighted as particularly representative of his poetic nature. Claussen's complete works are available in nine volumes.

Claussen and author Johannes Jørgensen co-wrote the journal Taarnet as part of the Danish Symbolism movement. To Claussen's regret, he never had a big breakthrough. Recognition eventually came among the Heretica circle and author Karen Blixen.

Claussen was closely linked with painter Albert Gottschalk.

He is buried in Gentofte cemetery.

Honors 
Ekbatana, from 1896, is included in the Danish culture canon.

Works
 , 1887
  1899
  1894
 , 1904
 , 1912
  1925

References

External links
Sophus Claussen; Danish Wikisource

1865 births
1931 deaths
Danish male poets
19th-century Danish poets
20th-century Danish poets
19th-century male writers
20th-century Danish male writers